Mitre Sports International Ltd., mostly known as Mitre, is an English sports equipment manufacturer based in Wakefield. Mitre is mainly focused on association football but also providing equipment (mostly balls) for other sports. Having founded in 1817 in Huddersfield, the company is one of the oldest of its type in the world. Mitre is currently a subsidiary of the British family–owned Pentland Group.

Products manufactured and commercialised by Mitre include sports equipment for association football (balls, team uniforms, clothing lines), rugby union (balls, training shirts), basketball (balls), and netball (balls, rings). Mitre also offers a list of accessories for those sports such as bags, space markers, water bottles, safety cones, among others.

The "Delta" football has been used in some professional leagues of the United Kingdom including the Football League Cup, The Football League, Scottish Premiership, Welsh Premier Division and the Football League Trophy. Mitre also supplies many other competitions including the Isthmian League, Evo-Stik Southern League, Spartan South Midlands League and many more. These leagues play with a variety of footballs including the Delta Hyperseam, Max Hyperseam and ProMax Hyperseam. Internationally, Mitre have its footballs used across a variety of competitions around including the AFF Championship and the S.League.

History 
In 1817 Benjamin Crook opened his tannery in Huddersfield, England, giving his own name to the company he founded. The origin of its name is related to the longtime friendship between Crook and the bishop of the village. Crook took the ceremonial head-dress worn by bishops in traditional Christianity (the "mitre") to name his company.

The company produced footballs and rugby balls for clubs all over the world, and in 1959 Mitre expanded into cricket, soft leather and bags. Sports footwear followed a year later. Manchester United's prominent footballer Denis Law became the first official Mitre spokesman in 1964. Two years later Mitre went on to become the official ball supplier for the English Football Association, and for the next forty years, the FA Cup Final was to be played with a Mitre ball.

Muhammad Ali wore Mitre in his 59th professional fight against Leon Spinks in New Orleans, and Stuart Pearce wore Mitre football boots in 1977. Mitre was also the official ball supplier to the 1987 Rugby World Cup, jointly hosted by Australia and New Zealand. In 1992, Mitre became the official ball supplier to the newly formed FA Premier League, introducing its synthetic footballs instead of leather balls, which had been used previously. In 2003 the Mitre ball was used in the Netball World Championships held in Jamaica. The England national netball team also appeared at the tournament wearing Mitre apparel.

In 2000 Mitre arrived in Argentina, signing deals with several Primera División clubs. Newell's Old Boys, Estudiantes de La Plata, Unión de Santa Fe, Belgrano de Córdoba, Arsenal de Sarandí and Chacarita Juniors were the first teams wearing uniforms by Mitre. Football star and UNICEF goodwill ambassador George Weah teamed up with Mitre in 2004 to donate 5,000 footballs to underprivileged children in Liberia and 5,000 footballs to Iraqi children. Another endorsee joined Mitre in 2006, when Australian cricketer and record breaking test wicket-taker Shane Warne was signed to wear Mitre footwear and protection.

In 2007 Mitre launched its new "Revolve" football ball to the EFL, where each club played with its own club coloured and badged ball. This was the first time this had happened. Mitre also re-entered the apparel markets with kit deals with Ipswich Town and Huddersfield Town FC. In 2008 Mitre signed All Black player Luke McAlister to be the figurehead of its rugby range. The same year, the company signed an agreement with the El Salvador national football team to be its exclusive uniform provider. In 2009 Mitre expanded its business in South America, becoming the official uniform provider of many teams of the Chilean league.

In June 2011, Mitre extended its deal with the Scottish Premier League to be the official ball supplier until 2015. In 2015 Mitre released their new Hyperseam technology, which will grace The Football League and Scottish Premier League for years to come as they both announced new sponsorship deals for Mitre to continue being the official ball supplier. In 2015 Mitre also started to personalised footballs as a gift option for young football fans  In 2016, Mitre announced its sponsorship deal to become the official match ball sponsor for the Singapore Professional Football League. Mitre also announced gloves sponsorship for Singaporean goalkeepers Nozawa Yosuke (Albirex Niigata Singapore), Khairulhin Khalid (Hougang United) and Beatrice Tan (Singapore women's national team). The sponsorship with Beatrice Tan marked the first time that a female footballer is being sponsored in Singapore.

In May 2017, Mitre brought back the "Delta" ball design as the official match ball of the English Football League since the 2017–18 season. The company also launched its "Legend Returns" campaign to promote the event. The football was unveiled live on Soccer AM and at Wembley Stadium.

Products 
The following chart contains all the product lines by Mitre.

Notes

Sponsorships
The following is a list with teams, associations and players that wear uniforms and equipment provided by Mitre:

Football

Club teams

  Grenades
  Deportivo Español
  Deportivo Morón
  Estudiantes (RC)
  Gimnasia y Esgrima (M)
  Los Andes
  Nueva Chicago 
  San Martín de Mendoza
  San Martín de San Juan
  Villa Mitre
  Deportes Tolima
  Glenn Hoddle Academy
  General Díaz de Luque
  Berwick Rangers
  Juventud de Las Piedras

Associations
Mitre provides its official balls for the following football associations:

  AFF Championship 
  The Football Association
  Liga Indonesia Baru
 Liga 1
 Indonesia President's Cup
 Liga 2
 Liga 3
  SPFL 
  LFF
  LPF
  Russian Cup
  FFL
  FAW
  Netball League (all tournaments)
  Football Association of Singapore 
  NPSL
  Vietnam Football Federation

Players

  Mark Schwarzer
  Andrew Plummer
  Nick Jordan
  Nick Jupp
  Tom Smith
  Liam O'Brien
  Luke Denis Le Seve
  Joshua Bowers
  Charlie Tan
  Danny Goldberg
  Andrey Bukhlitskiy
  Chad Harpur
  Ian Joyce
  Neil Etheridge
  Wayne Hennessey
  Rodolfo Zelaya
  Nozawa Yosuke
  Khairulhin Khalid
  Beatrice Tan

Netball
Mitre provides its official balls for the following netball association and players:

  Mo'onia Gerrard
  England national team
  South Africa national team

Rugby
The company sponsors the following players:
  Aaron Liffchak
  Peter Bracken
  Luke McAlister
  Albert Van den Berg
  Johann Muller
  Richard Mustoe
  Nick Macleod

Former sponsorships

Football
 Cameroon national football team (1994–95)
 New Zealand national football team
 Huddersfield Town (1999-2011)
 Ipswich Town (2008-2014)
 Norwich City (1994-1997)
 Notts County (1994-1997)
 El Salvador national football team (2009–17)
 Hibernian (1994-1998)

Associations
 Premier League (official match ball, 1992–2000)
 EFL (official match ball, 1976-2021)
 FA Cup (official match ball, 2018-present)

Notes

References
https://www.footyheadlines.com/2021/06/puma-efl-21-22-ball-revealed-no-more-mitre-after-45-years.html

External links 

 

Manufacturing companies established in 1817
Athletic shoe brands
Sportswear brands
Companies based in the London Borough of Barnet
Sporting goods manufacturers of the United Kingdom
Companies based in Huddersfield
Shoe companies of the United Kingdom
1817 establishments in England